Kornino is a rural locality (a selo) in Cherdynsky District, Perm Krai, Russia. The population was 81 as of 2010. There are 4 streets.

Geography 
Kornino is located 28 km southwest of Cherdyn (the district's administrative centre) by road. Ural is the nearest rural locality.

References 

Rural localities in Cherdynsky District